Theft Act (with its variations) is a stock short title used for legislation in the United Kingdom which relates to theft and other offences against property.

The Bill for an Act with this short title will have been known as a Theft Bill during its passage through Parliament.

Theft Acts may be a generic name either for legislation bearing that short title or for all legislation on that subject.

See also Larceny Act.

List

United Kingdom

England and Wales
The Theft Act 1730 (4 Geo.2 c.32) (Repealed by the Statute Law Revision Act 1963)
The Theft Act 1968
The Theft Act 1978
The Theft (Amendment) Act 1996

Scotland
The Theft Act 1607

Northern Ireland
The Theft Act (Northern Ireland) 1969
The Theft (Northern Ireland) Order 1978
The Theft (Amendment) (Northern Ireland) Order 1997

See also
List of short titles

Lists of legislation by short title
Criminal law of the United Kingdom